Julia is a feminine given name. 

Julia may also refer to:

In film and television
Julia (1974 film), a West German erotic film starring Sylvia Kristel
Julia (1977 film), an American drama starring Jane Fonda, Jason Robards and Vanessa Redgrave
Julia (2008 film), a French crime drama starring Tilda Swinton
Julia (2014 film), an American neo-noir horror film starring Ashley C. Williams
Julia (2021 film), a documentary about Julia Child
Julia(s), a 2022 French romance film
Julia (1968 TV series), a 1968–1971 American series starring Diahann Carroll
Julia (Mexican TV series), a 1979 Mexican telenovela
Julia (Polish TV series), a 2012 Polish soap opera
Julia (2022 TV series), an American drama series
Julia (Venezuelan TV series), a 1983 Venezuelan TV series
Julia (Sesame Street), a Muppet character on the children's television program

Songs
"Julia" (Beatles song), 1968
"Julia" (Chris Rea song), 1993
"Julia" (Conway Twitty song), 1987
"Julia" (Eurythmics song), 1984
"Julia" (Nick & Simon song), 2012
"Julia", a song by Ekseption from the album Beggar Julia's Time Trip
"Julia", a song by Goudie from the 2000 album Peep Show
"Julia", a 1958 Italian song by Johnny Dorelli
"Julia", a song from the album Please Come Home... Mr. Bulbous by King's X
"Julia", a song from the 2011 album Adelphi Has to Fly by Lucy Ward
"Julia", a song from the album Naveed by Our Lady Peace
"Julia", a 1975 song by Pavlov's Dog
"Julia", a song by Wang Leehom
"Julia", a song from the 2018 album Blood Red Roses by Rod Stewart
"Julia", a song from the 2014 album Jungle by Jungle

Places
Julia (Lydia), a town of ancient Lydia
Julia (river), Switzerland
Julia, Greater Poland Voivodeship, Poland
Julia, West Virginia, United States

People
Julia (surname)
Julia gens, a patrician family of Ancient Rome
Julia (clairvoyant) (fl. 1689), lady's maid of Queen Christina of Sweden in Rome, alleged clairvoyant and predictor

Other uses
Julia (programming language), a programming language for technical computing
Julia (unidentified sound), an underwater sound record by the NOAA
89 Julia, an asteroid
Julia (comics) (le avventure di una criminologa), an Italian comic book series
Julia (gastropod), a genus of minute bivalved gastropods in the family Juliidae
Julia (novel), 1975 novel by Peter Straub
J.U.L.I.A., a 2012 indie video game
"Julia", a speaking recording by Raffi on his 1995 album: Raffi Radio
Julia butterfly, Dryas iulia, misspelled as Dryas julia
Alpine Brigade Julia, a mountain warfare brigade of the Italian Army
List of storms named Julia, name used for storms in the Atlantic Ocean

See also
Julia set, in mathematics
Julieta (disambiguation)